Low-rise is a style of clothing designed to sit low on, or below, the hips. The style can also be called lowcut, hipster, or hip-hugger. and can apply to garments worn by males or females. The term can be applied to all garments that cover the wearer's crotch area, including trousers, jeans, shorts, skirts, panties, briefs, bikinis, pantyhose, and tights.

Terminology

History
The low-rise fashion expanded in the early 1990s after the March 1993 issue of the British magazine The Face which featured Kate Moss in low-rise jeans.

Backs were also cut low, but not so low that they exposed backside cleavage. It later adopted the style in men's wear. Gradually the wide acceptance of low-rise pants by men led to low-rise swimwear and underpants.

The trend became so popular that in 2002, a Barbie doll wearing low-rise jeans named "My Scene" Barbie was introduced in stores.

Indian fashion
The term is applied to saris and Ghagra cholis in India. Due to migration to different countries, many Indian women began to wear the normal sari below the waistline exposing the navel, which is known as low-rise sari. This type of sari is worn such that the petticoat is tied at some inches below the navel and just above the pubic area. Similarly, the lehengas of ghagra cholis are also worn in low-rise. Designer Manish Malhotra's Fashion Week collections regularly highlight low waisted ghaghras accompanied by short cholis. This were made popular by the female celebrities of Bollywood industry and other popular regional film industries like Tamil cinema and Telugu cinema. These are mainly worn by the rich, educated upper-class women who consider navel exposure as a fashion. However, sometimes, the navel is covered with the pallu in a low-rise non-transparent sari, as well.

Dress codes
Vitruvio Pollione Scientific High School, Avezzano, central Italy, asked students to stop wearing low-slung trousers that expose navels, underwear etc., Deputy Principal Nazzareno Desiderio elaborated in a phone interview: "It's a piece of advice, for their educational reflection." Inspired by the decision in Avezzano, the principal of Rome's Visconti High School Antonino Grasso had suggested that students show less skin and proposed a debate on the matter. In an interview he commented, "Today, boys are less tickled by such visions (of skin), because there's no more big effect in seeing a girl's legs or shoulders, lower back and navel".

In some corporations in India, saris are required to be worn in an elegant manner, avoiding navel exposure. Anita Gupta, senior vice-president at JWT Chennai commented, "Formal wear for women definitely covers saris without plunging necklines or glimpses of the belly button".

Restriction in countries
Low-rise clothing is completely forbidden in certain countries around the world, including Iran, Libya, Algeria, Afghanistan, and Yemen.

Images

Women

Men

See also
Navel in popular culture

References

External links

 The woes of low-rise pants-Has America's low-rise obsession gone too far? - Amanda Fortini

Fashion